Butler Lake is a small lake south of Wilmurt in Herkimer County, New York. It drains north via an unnamed creek that flows into West Canada Creek. Butler Lake is home to a pair of loons who migrate in each spring to rear their young. The lake is only just large enough as they require a "long runway" of water from which to take off. Atwood Lake is located east of Butler Lake.

See also
 List of lakes in New York

References 

Lakes of New York (state)
Lakes of Herkimer County, New York